Eucephalus is a genus of North American flowering plants in the family Asteraceae.

Eucephalus is a perennial up to 160 cm (64 inches) tall. It has numerous flower heads, some species with both ray disc florets but others with only disc florets. Disc florets are nearly always yellow in the genus, but ray florets can be white, pink, purple, or violet.

 Species

 Eucephalus breweri - California Nevada Oregon 
 Eucephalus elegans - Nevada Oregon Idaho Montana Wyoming Utah Colorado 
 Eucephalus engelmannii - California Nevada Utah Colorado Idaho Montana Washington British Columbia Alberta 
 Eucephalus glabratus  - California Oregon 
 Eucephalus glaucescens  Washington
 Eucephalus gormanii  - Oregon 
 Eucephalus ledophyllus - California Oregon Washington
 Eucephalus paucicapitatus - Washington British Columbia Alberta 
 Eucephalus tomentellus - California Oregon 
 Eucephalus vialis - California Oregon

References

Flora of North America
Asteraceae genera
Astereae